Ahmed Khan (born 3 June 1974) is an Indian choreographer, producer, director, and writer. After a period of acting, he has moved into film choreography, as well as writing, producing, and directing various Bollywood projects. In 2019, Khan also was on the judging panel of the celebrity dance show Nach Baliye 9 on Star Plus.

Life and career
Khan was born in Pune, Maharastra on 3 June 1974. He performed as a child actor in Mr. India before pursuing a career as a choreographer.

After Mr. India, Khan choreographed the films Taal, Ghajini, and Kick. During this period, he also directed Lakeer – Forbidden Lines, and worked on the comedy Fool n Final. He wrote and produced Paathshaala and Ek Paheli Leela. His latest directing venture, Baaghi 2, was a success at the box office.

Khan served as judge on Dance India Dance Lil Master during its third season, and was popular among contestants, who referred to him as "Pappi King".
Currently, he is a judge on the show Nach Baliye 9.

Personal life
Ahmed Khan is married to model Shaira Khan, who is a producer with Paperdoll Entertainment. Together, they have produced the films Paathshaala and Ek Paheli Leela.
The couple live in Andheri with their two sons, Azaan Khan and Subhaan Khan.

Ahmed Khan has narrowly escaped death twice. The first time occurred while he was filming at the World Trade Center in New York City only two days before the September 11 attacks. His second brush with death happened in 2004, when he was set to stay at a hotel that was destroyed in the 2004 Indian Ocean tsunami. Khan had cancelled his reservation at the last minute.

His brother, Bobby Khan, is an actor and was formerly married to Indian singer Sunidhi Chauhan.

Selected awards
 Filmfare Best Choreography Award - Rangeela (1995)
 Telugu Filmfare Award for Best Choreography - Ganesh (2000)
 Kannada Filmfare Award for Best Choreography - Yuva (2005)
 Filmfare Best Choreography Award - Kick (2015)
 IIFA Award - Kick (2015)
 Screen Awards for Best Choreography - Kick (2015)
 AIBA Award for Best Choreography - Kick (2015)
 SICA award - Heropanti (2015)
 Indian Films & Television Choreographers Association Award of Appreciation (2016)
 Star Screen Award for Best Action - Baaghi 2 (2019)
 Zee Cine Award for Best Action - Baaghi 2 (2019)
 Power Brands Jury Award for Best Action - Baaghi 2 (2019)
 Zee Business Award for 100 Crore Club Baaghi 2 (2019)

Filmography
Film

Television

References

External links
 
 
 

1974 births
Living people
21st-century Indian dancers
21st-century Indian film directors
Dancers from Maharashtra
Film directors from Mumbai
Film producers from Mumbai
Filmfare Awards winners
Hindi film producers
Hindi-language film directors
Indian choreographers
Indian male child actors
Indian male film actors
Indian male screenwriters
Male actors from Mumbai